Wola Kudypska  (German Wolla) is a settlement in the administrative district of Gmina Morąg, within Ostróda County, Warmian-Masurian Voivodeship, in northern Poland.

References

Wola Kudypska